The Ministry of Defence of North Macedonia is a Macedonian agency which oversees the management of the Army of the Republic of North Macedonia. The ministry mainly coordinates the defence policy of the country, corresponding with the President and the Prime Minister regularly. The MORM commands the ARM through the Chief of the General Staff (CGS).

Structure

Leadership 
 Slavjanka Petrovska - Defence minister
 Major General Vasko Gjurchinovski - Chief of the General Staff
 Deputy CGS for civil-military cooperation
 Deputy CGS for planning
 Deputy CGS for military operations

Departmental structure 
Administrative departments in the MORM help organize and deliver on the priorities of the ministry. The following departments are under the command of the MORM:

Department for Support to the Minister
Department for Communications, Analytics and Operational Support 
Department for Internal Audit
Department for Inspection in Defence 
Department for Policy and Planning 
Department for International Cooperation
Department for Civil-military co-operation
Department for Legal Affairs 
Human Resource Department 
Finance Department 
Logistics Department 
Real Estate Department
Department for Services and Tourism, Motor Pool and Maintenance
Department for Specialized Production 
C-4 Department 
Military Museum
Military Aviation

List of ministers

The post of defense minister was established on January 10, 1992, with the first minister being Trajan Gocevski. The current defence minister of North Macedonia is Slavjanka Petrovska.

See also 
 Army of the Republic of North Macedonia
 Minister of Defense (North Macedonia)
 Chief of the General Staff (North Macedonia)

References

External links
  

North Macedonia
Military of North Macedonia
Ministries established in 1991
1991 establishments in the Republic of Macedonia
Government of North Macedonia
North Macedonia